Aché Coelo (born July 16, 1985) is a Chadian sociologist and film director.

Life
Coelo was born in N'Djamena in 1985. She worked for the Kempinski hotel chain in their marketing department. She left working with her husband to become a commercial director of a subsidiary of Canal plus before helping with communications for Unicef in Chad.

From 2009 to 2011, Coelo was the host of "Espace Jeunes", a talk show on Chadian TV.

Coelo leads the Chadian association of mixed cultures which sponsors arts projects including the book Portraits of Chadian Women. In this book Coelo and Salma Khalil document the lives of 100 women from Chad.

Coelo founded the FETCOUM film festival. It was funded in part by the French embassy. The festival of short films ran in Chad for four days in June 2018. The independent council is intended to advice the French President of the underlying relationship between France and Africa.

In July 2019 she was appointed to Emmanuel Macron's Presidential Council for Africa. She joined Vanessa Moungar who was also a gender activist from Chad.

Works
 Between Four Walls (2014 film)
 Al-Amana (film)
 A Day at School in Chad (2018 film)
 Portraits of Chadian Women (book with Salma Khalil)

References

1985 births
Living people
People from N'Djamena
Chadian film directors
Chadian women film directors